This is a list of flags of previous Dutch municipalities, insofar as this flag is used and that flag is known. Not included in this list are village flags that never existed as a municipal flag. The flags are listed per province.

Drenthe

Flevoland
There are no known former municipal flags of Flevoland.

Friesland

Gelderland

Groningen

Limburg

North Brabant

North Holland

Overijssel

South Holland

Utrecht

Zeeland

See also 
 List of municipal flags of the Netherlands
 List of city flags in the Netherlands

References

municipalities.old
.Former municipal flags
Netherlands former municipal flags
Flags of former municipalities
Netherlands former municipalities